Mineral symbols (text abbreviations) are used to abbreviate mineral groups, subgroups, and species, just as lettered symbols are used for the chemical elements.

The first set of commonly used mineral symbols was published in 1983 and covered the common rock-forming minerals using 192 two- or three-lettered symbols. These type of symbols are  referred to as Kretz symbols. More extensive lists were subsequently made available in the form of publications or posted on journal webpages.

A comprehensive list of more than 5,700 IMA-CNMNC approved symbols (referred to as IMA symbols) compiled by L.N. Warr was published in volume 85 (issue 3) of the Mineralogical Magazine (2021). These symbols are listed alphabetically in the tables below. The approved listings are compatible with the system used to symbolize the elements, 30 of which occur as minerals.

Mineral symbols are most commonly represented by three-lettered text symbols, although one-, two- and four-lettered symbols also exist. Four methods of nomenclature are used:

 The initial letters of a name, for example: cyanotrichite: Cya and mitscherlichite: Mits.
 A combination considered characteristic of the mineral name, for example: ewingite: Ewg and neighborite: Nbo.
 A selection of letters expressing components of the name, for example: adranosite = Arn and hellandite: Hld.
 Lettered abbreviations when prefixes are present, for example: chlorocalcite = Ccal and nickelzippeite: Nizip.

New minerals approved by the International Mineralogical Association (IMA-CNMNC) are allocated unique symbols consistent with the main listing. New symbols are announced in the newsletters of the IMA-CNMNC. An updated "mineral symbol picker" list is also available for checking on the availability of symbols prior to submission for approval.

A  -  B  -  C  -  D  -  E  -  F  -  G  -  H  -  I  -  J  -  K  -  L  -  M  -  N  -  O  -  P  -  Q  -  R  -  S  -  T  -  U  -  V  -  W  -  X  -  Y  -  Z - Additional symbols

References 

Lists of abbreviations
Geology-related lists
 Symbols